Amahuaca is an indigenous language of the Amazon Basin in Perú and Brazil. It is also known as Amawaka, Amaguaco, Ameuhaque, Ipitineri, and Sayaco. Amahuaca is a Panoan language that is believed to be closely related to Cashinahua and Yaminawa. There around 220 speakers in Brazil, and around 328 speakers in Peru. 

30% of Amahuaca speakers are literate in Amahuaca and 50% are literate in Spanish. Amahuaca uses a Latin-based script. There are some bilingual schools. A dictionary has been developed along with a grammatical description and bible portions.

Phonology

See also
 Amhuaca people

References

External links 
 

Indigenous languages of Western Amazonia
Languages of Peru
Languages of Brazil
Panoan languages
Pano-Tacanan languages